Bou Ismaïl is a city in Bou Ismaïl District, Tipasa Province, Algeria. In 2008 it had a population of 40,984. Its French colonial name was Castiglione.

Notable residents
Jean-Pierre Bacri, French actor
Boualem Khoukhi, Algerian-Qatari footballer

References

Communes of Tipaza Province
Tipaza Province